Juan Pablo Geretto (born February 10, 1974) is an Argentine actor.

Awards

Nominations
 2013 Martín Fierro Awards
 Best new actor or actress

References

Argentine male actors
Living people
1974 births
Place of birth missing (living people)